Ginko may refer to:

 Inspector Ginko, a character in Italian comic series Diabolik
 The main character in the Japanese manga Mushishi
 Ginkō, Japanese for Bank
 Lisa Silverman, a character from the PlayStation video game Persona 2. "Ginko" is her nickname.
 a haiku walk

See also
 Ginkgo biloba: a plant (tree), food (seed from tree), and herbal extract (from leaf)
 Ginkgo: The mostly extinct genus of tree of which Ginkgo biloba is the only known survivor